Dream Girls was a Taiwanese girl group formed in 2011. The group consisted of members Emily Song, Tia Lee and Puff Kuo.

Members

Discography

EP Album

LP Album

Tours and concerts

Awards and nominations

References

Musical groups established in 2011
Mandopop musical groups
Taiwanese girl groups
2011 establishments in Taiwan